Arjona may refer to:
 Arjona, Bolívar, Colombia
 Arjona, Spain
 Taifa of Arjona, a medieval taifa kingdom in Spain
 Arjona (plant), genus of plants in the family Schoepfiaceae

People with the surname
 Adria Arjona (born 1992), Puerto Rican actress
 Adrià Arjona (born 1996), Spanish footballer
 Belén Arjona (born 1985), Spanish singer
 Jaime Homero Arjona (1906–1967), American linguist and educator
 Manuel María de Arjona (1771–1820), Spanish poet
 Ricardo Arjona (born 1964), Guatemalan singer-songwriter popular in Latin America
 William Arjona (born 1979), Brazilian volleyball player